A supreme deity, supreme god or supreme being is the conception of the sole deity of monotheistic religions, or, in polytheistic or henotheistic religions, the paramount deity or supernatural entity which is above all others.

Specifically, the term can refer to:

General 
Creator deity, often also the supreme deity in many religions
King of the gods, the lead god of a polytheistic pantheon
 Supreme god, the god exclusively worshipped by henotheists
God, the singular deity of monotheistic religions

Abrahamic religions 
God in Abrahamic religions
Yahweh in Jewish belief
The Trinity in most Christian traditions 
Jesus in some other Christian traditions 
Allah in Muslim belief: see God in Islam
Bahá in Bahá'í belief: see God in the Baháʼí Faith

Indian religions  
Para Brahman, in Hinduism
Vishnu, in Hinduism
Adi Parashakti, in Hinduism
Waheguru, in Sikhism

Ancient Roman and Greek religion 
Zeus, in ancient Greek religion
Jupiter (mythology), in the religion of ancient Rome, often identified with Zeus

Other 
Amun-Ra in some ancient Egyptian traditions
Hayyi Rabbi in Mandaeism 
Pangu, in Chinese folk religion
Radien-attje, the superior deity of the Sami
Rod (Slavic religion), in pre-Christian Slavic mythology
Tagroa Siria, in Rotuman society
Ukko, in Finnish mythology

See also 
 Absolute (philosophy)
 Conceptions of God